The Accidental Further Adventures of the Hundred-Year-Old Man is a 2018 comic novel written by Jonas Jonasson. It is the sequel to the 2009novel, The Hundred-Year-Old Man Who Climbed Out the Window and Disappeared. The story follows Allan Karlsson's further adventures in the present world.

Plot

After the events of the previous book, Allan Karlsson and his friend Julius Johnsson are spending a luxurious life at a hotel in Bali, Indonesia, using the money they got from the previous book. During their stay, Julius meets an exile Indian Simran Aryabhat Chakarty Copaldas (later renamed himself as Gustav Svensson) and together decide to set up an asparagus farm and sold them as Swedish, while Allan himself got a tablet (iPad) and entertained himself by reading the news. However, Julius, over time, realised that the money they have is running out and they may be unable to pay for the upcoming hotel's bills. Nevertheless, they both decided to celebrate Allan's 101st birthday before settling their finances.

However, at the birthday celebration, Julius and Allan accidentally set off in the hot-air balloon (after Julius was playing around with the controls) they hired for the celebration. The two crash into the Indian Ocean and are picked up by a North Korean ship which is transporting four-kilograms of uranium to North Korea. As the North Korean captain is unwilling to call the ship anywhere lest they will be exposed, the two are to be brought to North Korea or to be thrown overboard instead. Hence, Allan decided to pose as a nuclear weapon expert and claim he can enrich the uranium, hence the two proceeded on to North Korea, despite actually being unable to produce a nuclear bomb.

In North Korea, Allan met Kim Jong-un himself, and later the Swedish UN ambassador Margot Wallström who was there for unofficial secret peace talks with Kim. What Wallström didn't expect was that Kim organised a press conference on the Korean Central News Agency, announcing Allan as a nuclear weapon expert (also announced as Swiss instead of Swede by mistake) helping North Korea and praising the neutral nations for helping promoting peace with North Korea unlike Japan, South Korea or the United States. Seeing that Allan and Julius are just charlatans with no intentions of helping, she start making plans to help the both of them to escape. Meanwhile, Allan decides to buy as much time as possible, and starts planning to escape from North Korea, along with the briefcase of the uranium that was transported there. Allan managed to outwit the North Korean engineer by supplying him with formulas to keep him distracted and make a mess of the car so the North Korean driver transporting the two will have to leave, letting Allan take over the car. Eventually, Allan and Julius managed to reach the airport and checked in with the help of Wallström, while the engineer and the driver both committed suicide, while Kim, after discovering their escape, demanded Russia's help to track down Allan to kill him.

The two, along with Wallström, fly to New York City to the UN headquarters there. Allan and Wallström meet the president of the United States, Donald Trump, who is not in a good mood that day. Although Allan made a good impression during an initial meeting with him, Allan unintentionally insults Trump when he is playing golf later, commenting on his golfing skills. After seeing Trump lost his temper, he decides against giving Trump the uranium. Allan catches up with Julius, and the both meet UN ambassador for Germany Konrad Breitner, and they have a nice conversation over dinner. Allan then proposed handing over the uranium over to German Chancellor Angela Merkel, which the ambassador is happy to do. Allan then writes a note to Merkel to explain, before Allan and Julius left for Sweden.

Back in Stockholm, Sweden, Allan and Julius spend what they have left on two beers. Left with no choice, they decide to meet up with Julius' friend, who actually got arrested. As Julius has a blister, the two approach a shop run by a lady Sabine Johnsson, who decided to give them some bandages after some convincing. Sabina laments that business at the Séance shop and the coffin shop nearby isn't going well, but still accepts the two to stay in the shop. With the help of both Allan and Julius, her coffin business blooms, but it is cut short when there is a mix-up of coffins, in which a nicely-decorated coffin is sent to a group of neo-nazis instead of a swastika, pro-nazi-decorated coffin. The neo-nazi Johnny Engvall, being humiliated, decides to sought after the group and gunned down the coffin shop, but Sabina, Allan and Julius managed to escape in a hearse.

During their escape, they stopped by a pension house. Sabine and Julius decide to go back to clairvoyance and tries it on the pension manager. When she fainted, the trio decides to move on Malmö.

References 

2018 Swedish novels
Novels set in Sweden
Novels set in North Korea
Novels set in Kenya
Swedish-language novels
Works about old age
Swedish comedy novels
Cultural depictions of Kim Jong-un
Cultural depictions of Donald Trump
Cultural depictions of Angela Merkel